Los Titanes are a Colombian salsa music band. The group was founded in Barranquilla in 1981 by the trombonist Alberto Barros.

Discography
 1981: Los Titanes y Sus Invitados
 1982: Los Titanes
 1985: Llegaron los Titanes
 1986: Furor Bailable
 1988: Apriétala
 1989: Sobredosis de Amor y Salsa
 1990: Amor y Salsa
 1991: Tentación
 1993: En Su Salsa
 1993: Bastó Una Mirada
 1994: 6a. Avenida
 1995: El Titán de la Salsa
 1995: Grandes Éxitos de Salsa
 1996: Rompiendo Esquemas
 1998: Salsa al Máximo Voltaje
 1999: Tributo a Héctor Lavoe "La Voz"
 2001: Salsa Magic
 2001: Tremenda Salsa
 2003: Salsa Super Power
 2003: Heavy Salsa
 2008: Mano a Mano
 2010: Los Locos Del Corrido
 2010: Tributo a la Salsa Colombiana Vol. 3
 2011: Essential de Tributo a la Salsa Colombiana
 2012: Tributo a la Salsa Colombiana Vol. 4
 2013: Tributo a la Salsa Colombiana Vol. 5

References

Colombian salsa musical groups